Johann Niklaus Schneider-Ammann (born Schneider, 18 February 1952) is a Swiss businessman and politician who served as a Member of the Swiss Federal Council from 2010 to 2018. A member of FDP.The Liberals, he was President of the Swiss Confederation in 2016. During his tenure as a Federal Councillor, Schneider-Ammann headed the Federal Department of Economic Affairs, Education and Research.

Biography

Origin and private career
The son of a veterinarian born in Sumiswald in the canton of Bern, Schneider-Ammann graduated as an electrical engineer from the ETH Zürich in 1977 and obtained a Master of Business Administration from INSEAD in France in 1983. From 1990 to 2010, he acted as the head of his family's mechanical engineering company, Ammann Group, in the fourth generation, when he passed control over the company to his two children. Schneider-Ammann is married, has two children and lives in Langenthal.

Political career

In the 1999 federal election, Schneider-Ammann was elected to the Swiss National Council for the canton of Bern as a member of the Free Democratic Party (FDP/PRD). From 1999, he also chaired the corporate union Swissmem. He was reelected to the National Council in 2003 and 2007. In the context of the 2008 financial crisis, Schneider-Ammann took a critical stance on bonuses awarded to the finance industry. However, Schneider-Ammann's company moved substantial funds to a Jersey, a tax haven, the same year.

In 2009, Schneider-Ammann became a member of the newly-established FDP.The Liberals. In the 2010 election, he was elected to the Swiss Federal Council as Hans-Rudolf Merz's successor. He took office on 1 November 2010 as the head of the Federal Department of Economic Affairs, which became the Federal Department of Economic Affairs, Education and Research in 2013. He had previously announced his intention to step down from his corporate responsibilities as well as various board memberships if elected.

In 2015, he took office as Vice President of Switzerland under President Simonetta Sommaruga. He was inaugurated as President of the Swiss Confederation on 1 January 2016 along Vice President Doris Leuthard. In March 2016, he became an Internet meme after a speech on laughter that many deemed sad. On 1 June 2016, as President of Switzerland, Schneider-Ammann was present at the official opening of the Gotthard Base Tunnel, which became the world's longest railway tunnel, alongside German Chancellor Angela Merkel, French President François Hollande and Italian Prime Minister Matteo Renzi among others.

On 31 December 2018, Schneider-Ammann left the Federal Council; he was replaced by Karin Keller-Sutter on 1 January 2019.

Other activities 
 Asian Infrastructure Investment Bank (AIIB), Ex-Officio Member of the Board of Governors
 European Bank for Reconstruction and Development (EBRD), Ex-Officio Member of the Board of Governors
 Joint World Bank-IMF Development Committee, Member

Notes and references

External links 

|-

|-

|-

1952 births
Agriculture ministers of Switzerland
FDP.The Liberals politicians
Living people
Members of the National Council (Switzerland)
Members of the Federal Council (Switzerland)
People from Emmental District
People from Langenthal
Swiss Protestants